Gospel Church is a Protestant church situated in Minzhu Alley, in the county-level city of Mianzhu, Sichuan Province. First built in 1923, it was originally an Anglican church in the Szechwan Diocese of the Church in China. After the 2008 Sichuan earthquake, a new Gospel Church was built on Yuxian Road. The original church is also known simply as the Chapel.

History 

Protestantism was first brought to Mianzhu (formerly romanised as Mienchu) around 1894. In 1923, the medical missionary, John Howard Lechler (1883–1977), of the Church of England Church Missionary Society, together with other three missionaries, established the small chapel denominated Gospel Church. It is built in traditional Sichuanese architectural style with neo-Gothic elements, covering an area of 300 square metres. A two-storey wooden house providing accommodation for pastors and preachers was built in the courtyard.

The missionaries also established a church school and the Jen Tse Hospital. Lechler returned to England in 1932, for reporting his work to the Church. Before his departure, he invited Dr Montagu Robert Lawrence, the elder brother of T. E. Lawrence, to working as a locum in the hospital during his absence.

After the communist takeover of China in 1949, Christian Churches in China were forced to sever their ties with respective overseas Churches, which has thus led to the merging of Gospel Church into the communist-established Three-Self Patriotic Church. During the 2008 Sichuan earthquake, the church was damaged beyond repair. A new Gospel Church was built on Yuxian Road, completed in an entirely neo-Gothic style.

See also 
 Anglicanism in Sichuan
 Gospel Church, Kangding
 Gospel Church, Wanzhou
 :Category:Former Anglican churches in Sichuan

References

External links 
 Original Gospel Church
 Rebuilt Gospel Church

20th-century Anglican church buildings
20th-century churches in China
Churches completed in the 1920s
Churches completed in the 2010s
Mianzhu
Protestant churches in China
Rebuilt churches
Mianzhu
Traditional Chinese architecture
Buildings and structures in Deyang
Mianzhu